Luis Fernando Escobar Zelaya (born 25 April 1975) is a Paraguayan football manager and former player who played as a midfielder. He is the current manager of Deportivo Santaní.

Career
Born in Luque, Escobar graduated from Sportivo Luqueño. After making his first team debut in 1994, he subsequently represented Colegiales, Cerro Porteño, 12 de Octubre, Sport Colombia, Sportivo San Lorenzo and Nacional Asunción in his home country, aside from a period in Guatemala's Santa Lucía Cotzumalguapa.

After retiring Escobar became a manager, and won three regional championships in a row with Salto del Guairá. He then managed lower league sides in his native region before being named in charge of General Díaz's youth setup in 2017.

In 2018, while still working for General Díaz, Escobar led Tembetary to the Cuarta División title and subsequent promotion to the Primera División B. On 10 February 2019, he was named interim manager of General Díaz in the Primera División.

Escobar returned to the youth setup in April 2019, after the appointment of Cristian Martínez. He returned to Tembetary for the 2019 campaign, narrowly missing out another promotion.

On 9 November 2020, Escobar returned to his first club Sportivo Luqueño, now appointed first team manager.

Honours
Tembetary
Paraguayan Cuarta División: 2018

References

External links

1975 births
Living people
Sportspeople from Luque
Paraguayan footballers
Association football midfielders
Sportivo Luqueño players
Colegiales footballers
Cerro Porteño players
12 de Octubre Football Club players
Sport Colombia footballers
Club Sportivo San Lorenzo footballers
Club Nacional footballers
Paraguayan expatriate footballers
Expatriate footballers in Guatemala
Paraguayan football managers
Club General Díaz (Luque) managers
Sportivo Luqueño managers
Deportivo Santaní managers